Euphemia of Kuyavia (c. 1265 – March 18, 1308) was a Kuyavian princess, who was Queen consort of Galicia-Volhynia.

She was the daughter of Casimir I of Kuyavia by his third wife Euphrosyne, daughter of Casimir I of Opole. Euphemia was sister of Władysław I the Elbow-high, she was wife of Yuri I of Galicia and mother of Andrew of Galicia and Lev II of Galicia.

The only preserved evidence of Euphemia's existence is from Jan Długosz's Yearbooks, which reported that on March 18, 1308 Euphemia died and that she was the daughter of Prince Casimir and the wife of Yuri I, who died in the same year on April 21, which was also his birthday.

Biography

Birth
Her parents' marriage was concluded in mid 1257, her father died on December 14, 1267. Thus, Euphemia soon after the wedding. Literature puts her birth at around 1265. In the absence of sources of an accurate date of birth, it is not possible to determine when Euphemia was born.

It is most likely that Euphemia was named after her aunt, Euphemia of Greater Poland. There is also a possibility, though less likely, that she received her name from a daughter of Swantopolk II, Duke of Pomerania because her father tried to make peace with him.

Marriage
As reported by Jan Długosz, Euphemia was married to Yuri I of Galicia. The date of the wedding is however unknown. Certainly, the marriage took place before the second half 1290, the year in which Euphemia's niece, Fenenna of Kuyavia married Andrew III of Hungary. There are however some predictions of when the marriage took place.

One of these declares that the marriage took place in the summer of 1289. When Yuri was in competition for the throne of Cracow between Euphemia's cousin, Bolesław II of Masovia and Henry IV Probus Euphemia's brother helped Yuri. According to this hypothesis in the summer of 1289 the situation changed when Conrad II of Masovia's brother the Prince of Płock brother decided to separate Sandomierz from his brother. Lesser knights opposing the plan began to promote the plans of Euphemia's half-brother, Ziemomysł of Kuyavia. This strengthened Lev I of Galicia's claim over the other candidates for the throne of Kraków. In return for the military aid against the Duke of Mazovia, Lev I received Lublin. An alliance with Euphemia's brother meant Euphemia could marry his son, Yuri.

Children 
Euphemia and Yuri I were parents to four children:
Andrew of Galicia (d. 1323), King of Galicia-Volhynia
Lev II of Galicia (d. 1323), King of Galicia-Volhynia
Maria (d. January 11, 1341), married Trojden I of Masovia
Anastasia (d. 1364-65), married Aleksandr Mikhailovich of Tver, they were parents of Uliana of Tver, who was the mother of Jogaila

Ancestry

References

Date of birth unknown
1308 deaths
Piast dynasty
Polish Roman Catholics
Year of birth uncertain
13th-century Polish people
13th-century Polish women